Nash is a surname of Irish, English,  Welsh or  Jewish origin. The surname went from 'Ash' to 'Nash' by colloquialism, and was established from an early date in Ireland and Wales. A second origin is the Americanization of similar sounding Jewish surnames.

Notable people with the surname
Adam Nash (disambiguation), various people
Albert C. Nash (1826–1890), American architect
Albert L. Nash (1921–2015), American politician
Alex Nash (1923–1944), Australian footballer
Alexander Nash (1849–1906), English footballer
Alfred George Nash (1853–1930), Jamaican civil engineer
Anthony Nash (disambiguation), various people
Abner Nash (1740–1786), American politician
Archibald Frazer-Nash, engineer who founded the automotive firm Frazer Nash Limited
Beau Nash (Richard Nash, 1674–1762), Anglo-Welsh dandy and leader of fashion
Brendan Nash (born 1977), Australian cricketer
Brian Nash (born 1963), English guitarist 
C. Nash (rugby league), Australian rugby league player
Carlo Nash (born 1973), English footballer
Charles Nash (disambiguation), various people
Clara Hapgood Nash (1839–1921), American lawyer
Clarence Nash (1904–1985), American voice actor
Claude H. Nash (born 1943), American biochemist
David Nash (disambiguation), several people
Diane Nash (born 1938), American civil rights activist
Dion Nash (born 1971), New Zealand cricket player
E. B. Nash (1838–1917), American homeopath
E. J. H. Nash (1898–1982), English clergyman and evangelist
Eddie Nash (born Adel Gharib Nasrallah in June 1929), convicted gangster and former nightclub and restaurant owner in Los Angeles
Edith Nash (1913–2003), American poet and educator
Edgar Nash (1832-1915), American businessman and politician
Edward Nash (disambiguation), various people
Edwin Nash (1812–1884), English ecclesiastical architect
Fiona Nash (born 1965), Australian senator
Francis Nash (1742–1777), American soldier
Frank Nash (1887–1933), American bank robber and gangster
Frank Nash (footballer) (1907–1992), Australian rules footballer
Frederick Nash (1781–1858), American lawyer and jurist
Frederick Nash (painter) (1782–1856), English painter 
Ged Nash (born 1975), Irish politician 
George K. Nash (1842–1904), American politician
George Valentine Nash (1864–1921), American botanist
Gerald Ewart Nash (1896–1976), Canadian World War I flying ace
Graham Nash (born 1942), British singer-songwriter
Harold Nash (born 1970), American football player and coach 
Harold L. Nash (1892–1975), American engineer and politician
Helen Elizabeth Nash (1921-2012), American pediatrician 
Henry Nash (1869–1902), American pioneer and soldier
Jack Nash (disambiguation), various people
James Nash (disambiguation), various people
Jason Nash (born 1973), American actor and comedian
Jim Nash (disambiguation), various people
Joe Nash (born 1960), American football player
John Nash (disambiguation), various people
Jørgen Nash (1920–2004), Danish artist and writer
Joseph Nash (1809–1878), English watercolor painter and lithographer
Joseph Nash (footballer), English footballer
Kate Nash (born 1987), English singer-songwriter
Kateřina Nash (born 1977), Czech cross-country skier and cyclist
Katherine Nash (1910–1982), American sculptor
Kevin Nash (born 1959), semi-retired American professional wrestler
Knowlton Nash (1927–2014), Canadian newscaster
Le'Bryan Nash (born 1992), American player in the Israeli Basketball Premier League
Leigh Nash (born 1976), American singer and composer
Leroy Nash (1915–2010), American criminal 
Lewis Nash (born 1958), American jazz drummer
Lewis H. Nash (1852–1923), American engineer
Malcolm Nash (1945–2019), Welsh cricket player and coach
Martin Nash (soccer) (born 1975), Canadian soccer player and coach; brother of Steve Nash
Matthew Nash (born 1981), Australian soccer player and coach
Michael Nash (disambiguation), various people
N. Richard Nash (1913–2000), American writer and dramatist 
Niecy Nash (born 1970), American comedian, actress and television personality
Nash the Slash, stage name of James Jeffrey Plowmen (1948–2014), Canadian musician
Ogden Nash (1902–1971), American poet
Paul Nash (artist) (1889–1946), British painter
Philip Nash (1906–1982), English civil servant
Philleo Nash (1909–1987), American government official and educator
Richard Nash (disambiguation), various people
Robert Nash (disambiguation), various people
Roger Nash (born 1942), British-Canadian poet
Ronald H. Nash (1936–2006), American philosophy professor
Royston Nash (1933–2016), English-born conductor
Steve Nash (born 1974), Canadian basketball player
Su-Elise Nash (born 1981), English singer who rose to fame with Mis-Teeq
Thomas Nash (disambiguation), various people
Tyson Nash (born 1975), Canadian-born hockey player
Walter Nash (1882–1968), New Zealand politician
Warwick Nash (1907–1983), Irish chess master
William Nash (Lord Mayor of London), English grocer, politician, and Lord Mayor of London

Fictional Characters 
Athena Grant Nash, a LAPD sergeant from the American TV series 9-1-1
Bobby Nash, a LAFD fire captain from the American TV series 9-1-1
Charlie Nash, a character from the Street Fighter series
Ellie Nash, a character from the Canadian drama Degrassi: The Next Generation
Russell Nash, a character in the film Highlander

References

See also
Nash (disambiguation)

Surnames
English-language surnames